The Women's slalom competition of the 1972 Winter Olympics at Sapporo, Japan, was held at Teine on Friday, February 11.

The defending world champion was Ingrid Lafforgue of France, while her sister Britt Lafforgue was the defending World Cup downhill champion and France's Françoise Macchi led the 1972 World Cup.

Barbara Cochran was the winner, edging Danièle Debernard by a scant two hundredths of a second; the two had the  fastest times in both runs and were well ahead of the field. It was the first gold medal for the United States in alpine skiing in twenty years.

Results

Source:

References 

Women's slalom
Oly
Alp
Women's slalom